Bassel al-Assad Stadium may refer to:

 Bassel al-Assad Stadium (Homs)
 Bassel al-Assad Stadium (al-Hasakah)

See also
Bassel (disambiguation)